Marye is a surname and personal name, most often seen as an alternate spelling of "Mary". Notable people with the name include:

Surname
 Madison Marye, politician
 Simon B. Marye, politician
 John Lawrence Marye, Jr., politician
 P. Thornton Marye, architect
 George T. Marye, banker and diplomat

Personal name
 Marye Dahnke, home economist
 Marye Anne Fox, chemist and administrator
 Marye of Yejju, warlord